Olmstead Place State Park is a  Washington state park that preserves a working pioneer farm in Kittitas County. Park activities include picnicking, hiking, fishing, interpretive activities, wildlife viewing, and touring the living farm museum. The park was added to the National Register of Historic Places in 1971.

References

External links
Olmstead Place State Park Washington State Parks and Recreation Commission
Olmstead Place State Park Map Washington State Parks and Recreation Commission

State parks of Washington (state)
Museums in Kittitas County, Washington
Farm museums in Washington (state)
Open-air museums in Washington (state)
Parks in Kittitas County, Washington